Bakalchuk is a surname. Notable people with the surname include:

 Johnatan Bakalchuk (born 1998), Israeli chess player
 Tatyana Bakalchuk (born 1975), Russian entrepreneur